The 2017 IIHF U18 World Championship Division I were a pair of international under-18 ice hockey tournaments organised by the International Ice Hockey Federation. The Division I A and Division I B tournaments represented the second and the third tier of the IIHF World U18 Championship. For the 2017 schedule both tournaments took place at the Bled Ice Hall in Slovenia.

Division I A

The Division I A tournament was played in Bled, Slovenia, from 7 to 13 April 2017. As none of the participating countries submitted a bid to host the tournament, Bled was asked to host both the Division IA and IB tournaments.

Participants

Match officials
4 referees and 7 linesmen were selected for the tournament.

Referees
 Andrea Benvegnu
 Christoffer Holm
 Paweł Meszyński
 Viktor Trilar

Linesmen
 Anže Bergant
 Matjaž Hribar
 Raivis Jučers
 Ludvig Lundgren
 Shaun Morgan
 Tommi Niittylä
 Viktor Zinchenko

Standings

Results
All times are local. (Central European Summer Time – UTC+2)

Statistics and awards

Scoring leaders 
List shows the top skaters sorted by points, then goals.
GP = Games played; G = Goals; A = Assists; Pts = Points; +/− = Plus-minus; PIM = Penalties in minutes; POS = Position
Source: IIHF.com

Leading goaltenders
Only the top five goaltenders, based on save percentage, who have played 40% of their team's minutes are included in this list.

TOI = Time on ice (minutes:seconds); SA = Shots against; GA = Goals against; GAA = Goals against average; Sv% = Save percentage; SO = Shutouts

Source: IIHF.com

IIHF best player awards
 Goaltender:  Demid Yeremeyev
 Defenceman:  Daniel Andersen
 Forward:  Alexandre Texier
Source: IIHF.com

Division I B

The Division I B tournament was played in Bled, Slovenia, from 15 to 21 April 2017.

Participants

Match officials
4 referees and 7 linesmen were selected for the tournament.

Referees
 Damian Bliek
 Stian Halm
 Miklós Haszonits
 Sergei Sobolev

Linesmen
 Knut Einar Bråten
 Andreas Weise Krøyer
 Gregor Miklič
 Damir Rakovič
 Marko Šaković
 Dmitry Shishlo
 Áron Soltész

Standings

Results
All times are local. (Central European Summer Time – UTC+2)

Statistics and awards

Scoring leaders 
List shows the top skaters sorted by points, then goals.
GP = Games played; G = Goals; A = Assists; Pts = Points; +/− = Plus-minus; PIM = Penalties in minutes; POS = Position
Source: IIHF.com

Leading goaltenders
Only the top five goaltenders, based on save percentage, who have played 40% of their team's minutes are included in this list.

TOI = Time on ice (minutes:seconds); SA = Shots against; GA = Goals against; GAA = Goals against average; Sv% = Save percentage; SO = Shutouts

Source: IIHF.com

IIHF best player awards
 Goaltender:  Žiga Kogovšek
 Defenceman:   Daiki Miura
 Forward:  Jan Drozg
Source: IIHF.com

References

2017 IIHF World U18 Championships
IIHF World U18 Championship Division I
International ice hockey competitions hosted by Slovenia
Sport in Bled
April 2016 sports events in Europe
2016–17 in Slovenian ice hockey